Johnny Fenwick (born 20 November 1994) is an English footballer who plays as a defender for Sacramento Republic in the USL Championship.

Career

College & amateur
Fenwick played four years of college soccer at High Point University between 2015 and 2018. While at college, Fenwick also appeared for USL PDL sides North Carolina Fusion U23 and Des Moines Menace.

Professional
On 18 January 2019, Fenwick signed for USL Championship side San Antonio FC.

Following his release from San Antonio, Fenwick signed for fellow USL Championship side Las Vegas Lights on 28 February 2020.

On 11 August 2021, Fenwick signed for FC Tulsa for the remainder of the season. He was released by Tulsa following the 2022 season.

On 9 February 2023, Fenwick was announced as a new signing for USL Championship side Sacramento Republic.

References

External links
Profile at HPU Athletics

1994 births
Living people
High Point Panthers men's soccer players
North Carolina Fusion U23 players
Des Moines Menace players
San Antonio FC players
Las Vegas Lights FC players
FC Tulsa players
Sacramento Republic FC players
USL Championship players
USL League Two players
English footballers
English expatriate footballers
Association football defenders
Footballers from Newcastle upon Tyne